Bo Derek (born Mary Cathleen Collins, November 20, 1956) is an American actress and model. Her breakthrough role was in the romantic comedy film 10 (1979), directed by Blake Edwards. Other film credits include Richard Lang's A Change of Seasons (1980); and first husband John Derek's Fantasies; Tarzan, the Ape Man (both 1981); Bolero (1984) and Ghosts Can't Do It (1989), all of which received negative reviews. Widowed in 1998, Derek married actor John Corbett in 2020.

Early life 
Derek was born Mary Cathleen Collins in Long Beach, California. Her father, Paul Collins, was a Hobie Cat executive, and her mother, Norma (née White), was a make-up artist and hairdresser to Ann-Margret. Collins's parents divorced, and her mother remarried to stunt performer Bobby Bass. She grew up with three siblings: two sisters and a brother. 

Collins attended Narbonne High School and George S. Patton Continuation School, both in Harbor City, California. She remarked in a 1985 interview on Late Night with David Letterman:

Career

Acting 
While attending Narbonne High School at age 16 in 1973, Collins auditioned for the female lead in  John Derek's Fantasies, a low-budget romantic drama film set in Greece. Although Derek had been considering Collins for the part, he felt that her naturally blonde hair was ill-suited to the character, whom he saw as a brunette. He nevertheless offered Collins the role
on condition that she dye her hair darker. Collins agreed and was added to the cast. In view of several risqué scenes, including brief depictions of nudity, Derek twice reedited the film in efforts to sell it to major theatrical studios. Fantasies remained unreleased until 1981, at which time it received negative notices.

During the course of these events, Collins became sexually involved with John Derek, who was 30 years her senior and still married to actress Linda Evans. Upon his divorce from Evans, Derek moved to Germany with Collins, where he would not be subject to prosecution under California statutory rape laws—the reason being that Collins was under the age of consent. 

In 1976, at the age of 19, Collins married John Derek. By this time, she had come to be known professionally as Bo Derek: an amalgam of her former stage name Bo Shane and married name Derek.

In 1977, director Michael Anderson cast Derek in a small role in his horror film Orca - The Killer Whale, in which Derek's character has her leg bitten off by the title character.

In 1979, Derek was selected over Melanie Griffith, Heather Thomas, Tanya Roberts, and several others for the role of Jenny Hanley in the romantic comedy film 10. Directed by Blake Edwards, the film starred Dudley Moore as a middle-aged man who finds Derek's character to be the ideal woman; i.e., a perfect 10. Derek's appearance in a dream sequence, running towards Moore in a tight-fitting, nude-colored one-piece swimsuit, launched her status as a mainstream sex symbol. Distinguished by Derek's cornrow hairstyle, the sequence has often been parodied. 10 was a critical and financial success.

After 10, Derek was cast in A Change of Seasons (1980), a dramatic-comedy film from Richard Lang that also featured Shirley MacLaine and Anthony Hopkins. Derek played a college student who has an affair with her older, married professor. A Change of Seasons was only a moderate box-office success, with critics reviewing it and Derek's performance unfavorably ("The only appealing performance is Miss MacLaine's").

In 1981, Derek starred in MGM's R-rated Tarzan, the Ape Man, her first leading role in a mainstream Hollywood film. Directed by John Derek, the film dealt little with Tarzan and instead focused on Derek's character of Jane Parker, and specifically on Derek's physical attributes. Derek appears nude in several scenes, one of which involved her being bathed and body-painted. Prior to the film's release, MGM and the film's distributor, United Artists, were sued by the Edgar Rice Burroughs estate over the name of the film, as Derek's role and body overshadowed the story of Tarzan. Although the film received negative reviews from multiple critics, Tarzan, the Ape Man became a box-office success, making over $35 million in ticket sales and becoming the 15th highest-grossing film of 1981. For her performance as Jane Parker, Derek shared the Golden Raspberry Award for Worst Actress with Faye Dunaway, the latter for her starring role as Joan Crawford in Mommie Dearest.

Derek next appeared in the erotic comedy-drama film Bolero (1984). Directed again by John Derek, Bolero explores the female protagonist's sexual awakening, and her journey around the world to find an ideal first lover to take her virginity. Its sexual nature and substantial use of nudity earned the film an X rating—generally reserved for pornographic or extremely violent horror films. Critical reviews for Bolero, including Derek's performance, were negative ("[Bo Derek] would be a lot more appealing if she tried less assiduously to please"), and the film failed to recoup its production costs. For her performance in Bolero, Derek won her second Golden Raspberry Award for Worst Actress. The film received five other Golden Raspberry Awards: Worst Picture, Worst Director (John Derek), Worst Screenplay (John Derek), Worst New Star (Olivia d'Abo), and Worst Musical Score (Peter Bernstein and Elmer Bernstein). 

In 1987, Derek teamed up with Steven Paul of the firm sales agency Paul Entertainment to sell the unreleased feature film, A Knight of Love, in which she was set to star; but the project never came to fruition.

After a five-year hiatus, Derek returned to feature films with the fantasy comedy-drama Ghosts Can't Do It (1989). The final collaboration of Derek with her husband as director, Ghosts Can't Do It was a failure both critically (a "cinematic abomination") and financially. For her performance in the film, during which she delivered such lines as "You have my heart...how can I live without my heart," Derek won her third Golden Raspberry Award for Worst Actress. Ghosts Can't Do It won three additional Golden Raspberry Awards for Worst Picture, Worst Director (John Derek), and Worst Supporting Actor (Donald Trump).

Following Ghosts Can’t Do It, Derek appeared in the television films Hot Chocolate (1992) and Shattered Image (1994), and the straight-to-video film Woman of Desire (1994). For her performance in the 1995 comedy film Tommy Boy, Derek was nominated for a Golden Raspberry Award for Worst Supporting Actress but ultimately lost to Madonna for her performance in Four Rooms.

In 1998, Derek guest-starred on four episodes of the television series Wind on Water. In 1999, she appeared on The Drew Carey Show, and in the early 2000s, she had guest roles on Family Law, Queen of Swords, Two Guys, a Girl and a Pizza Place, Lucky, Still Standing, and 7th Heaven.

At the 20th Golden Raspberry Awards in 2000, Derek was nominated for Worst Actress of the Century, sharing the nomination with Madonna (the eventual winner), Brooke Shields, Elizabeth Berkley, and Pia Zadora.

Derek appeared in several more feature films during the early 2000s, including Frozen with Fear (2000), The Master of Disguise (2002), for which she received her second Golden Raspberry Award nomination for Worst Supporting Actress, and Malibu's Most Wanted (2003). 

In 2006, Derek starred in 40 episodes of the 65-episode telenovela series Fashion House. In 2012, she appeared on CSI: Miami. 

Derek had a featured role in the 2015 made-for-TV campy horror film Sharknado 3: Oh Hell No!.

Politics
Derek, who describes herself as independent, supported George H. W. Bush in 1988 and 1992, and campaigned for his son George W. Bush in 2000 and 2004. She appeared at both Republican conventions with respect to the latter's presidential candidacies. Derek voted for Barack Obama in 2008. She has also appeared at public events with Republican Congressman David Dreier of Southern California.

When White House Chief of Staff Josh Bolten was asked about his relationship with Derek on the April 30, 2006 edition of Fox News Sunday with Chris Wallace, Bolten said she was a friend and a "good supporter of the President".  Also in 2006, Derek was appointed to the board of trustees of the John F. Kennedy Center for the Performing Arts by President George W. Bush, on the operations committee.

In 2012, Derek endorsed Mitt Romney for president.

In a 2020 interview with Variety, when asked who she was supporting in the then-upcoming presidential election, Derek explained, "I don’t talk about who I vote for anymore. I supported Bush 43 and I became one of the poster girls for the Republicans. But I’m an independent. I don’t want to be pigeonholed and labeled as one thing or another." In the same interview, Derek spoke highly of President Donald Trump. Recounting his cameo in 1989's Ghosts Can't Do It, she said that the scene was written specifically for him and that "he was great."

Other work
In 1980, Derek was featured twice in Playboy magazine; and then again in 1981, 1984, and 1994.

Derek was set to participate in the 2016 Comedy Central roast of Rob Lowe, but was unable to attend due to a scheduling conflict.

Personal life

Horse owner and activist 
A horse lover and riding enthusiast since childhood, Derek owns Andalusian horses and is a spokesperson for the Animal Welfare Institute's campaign to end horse slaughter through passage of federal and state legislation. On February 5, 2002, she published her autobiography entitled Riding Lessons: Everything That Matters in Life I Learned from Horses. She serves on the California Horse Racing Board.

Wounded veterans advocate 
Derek is a national honorary chairperson for Veterans Affairs' National Rehabilitation Special Events. She attended the 17th annual Disabled Veterans Winter Sports Clinic in Snowmass Village, Colorado. In 2003, she received the VA's highest honor from Secretary of Veterans Affairs, Anthony Principi. Derek makes regular appearances on United Service Organizations tours. The Special Forces Association named her an honorary Green Beret.

Derek's father, Paul Collins, was a radio operator during the Korean War. Her stepfather Bobby Bass, and her late husband, John Derek, were military veterans.

Wild Aid
Derek has been active for 18 years with the environmental agency WildAid, which provides funds to protect sharks and dissuade people from purchasing wildlife products. On August 13, 2020, she was a guest on the Discovery Channel's Shark Week.

Relationships 

After Derek began a relationship with John Derek when she was 16, they moved to Germany, where John would not be subject to prosecution under California statutory rape laws. They returned to the United States soon after Derek's 18th birthday. They wed in 1976 and remained married until John's death from heart failure in 1998.

Since 2002, Derek has been in a relationship with actor John Corbett, with whom she lives on a ranch in Santa Barbara, California. They married in December 2020.

Acting credits

Film

Television

Production credits

Film

References

External links 
 
 Interview with Bo Derek

1956 births
Living people
20th-century American actresses
21st-century American actresses
Actresses from Long Beach, California
American film actresses
American television actresses